Pablo Carreño Busta defeated Jaume Munar in the final, 6–1, 2–6, 6–4 to win the inaugural Men's Singles tennis title at the 2021 Andalucía Open. Notably, this was the first tournament in ATP history to feature 4 semifinalists from the same nation.

This was the first edition of the tournament, primarily organised due to the cancellation of some tournaments in 2021, due to the COVID-19 pandemic.

Seeds
The top four seeds received a bye into the second round.

Draw

Finals

Top half

Bottom half

Qualifying

Seeds

Qualifiers

Qualifying draw

First qualifier

Second qualifier

Third qualifier

Fourth qualifier

References

External links
Main draw
Qualifying draw

2021 ATP Tour
2021